Septoria caryae is a fungal pecan-infecting plant pathogen.

References

External links 
 Index Fungorum
 USDA ARS Fungal Database
 

caryae
Fungal tree pathogens and diseases
Nut tree diseases
Fungi described in 1887